Yeom Yoon-jung is a South Korean curler. She was the alternate on the South Korean National Women's Curling Team from 2015–16.

Career
Yeom played second for Gim Un-chi at the 2009 Pacific-Asia Junior Curling Championships where the team won a bronze medal. She joined the Kim Ji-sun rink as their alternate in 2014 with Gim throwing fourth stones, Um Min-ji at third, Lee Seul-bee at second and Ji-sun skipping the team but throwing the lead rocks. They won the 2015 South Korean National Curling Championships and were the South Korean National Women's Curling Team for the 2015–16 season. They lost the final of the 2015 Pacific-Asia Curling Championships to Japan's Satsuki Fujisawa. This meant they qualified South Korea for the 2016 World Women's Curling Championship, Yeom's first. The team surprised many by defeating higher-ranked teams Sweden and Canada. They finished the week in seventh place with a 5–6 record. The team lost the semifinal of the 2016 Korean Nationals in April 2016 and would lose their title of the national team to the Kim Eun-jung rink. Kim stepped back from competitive curling after the event and Yeom was moved to lead on the team. After the team didn't win the 2017 Nationals, Yeom stepped back from competitive curling.

Teams

References

External links

Living people
Sportspeople from Gyeonggi Province
People from Uijeongbu
South Korean female curlers
Year of birth missing (living people)